The Lößnitz tramway ( or Lößnitzschaukel) was a  interurban tramway that connected Dresden with Radebeul in the German state of Saxony. It should not be confused with the Radebeul–Radeburg railway, known in German as the Lößnitzgrundbahn or Lößnitzdackel, which is a  gauge steam railway.

History
The Lößnitz tramway was opened in 1899, and provided interchange with the Dresden tram network at its inner terminus at Mickten in Dresden's suburbs. Today it forms part of line 4 of the Dresdner Verkehrsbetriebe, which runs through from central Dresden and continues beyond Radebeul to Coswig and Weinböhla.

See also 
Trams in Dresden
Lockwitztal tramway

Interurban railways
Tram transport in Germany
Transport in Dresden
Radebeul
Transport in Saxony
Metre gauge railways in Germany
1450 mm gauge railways